The 1984–85 season was Cardiff City F.C.'s 58th season in the Football League. They competed in the 22-team Division Two, then the second tier of English football, finishing twenty-first, suffering relegation to Division Three.

The season also saw the retirement of Phil Dwyer, whose 13-year spell at the club saw him become the record appearance holder.

Players

 

   

    

Source

League standings

Results by round

Fixtures and results

Second Division

Source

Milk Cup

FA Cup

Welsh Cup

References

Bibliography

Welsh Football Data Archive

1984-85
English football clubs 1984–85 season
Welsh football clubs 1984–85 season